Listed below are English actors and actresses of note and some notable individuals born in England.

Actors and actresses

A-C

 Vanessa Angel (born 1966)
 Richard Armitage (born 1971)
 Eliza Bennett (born 1992)
 Rosalind Bennett (born 1966)
 Martin Benson (1918–2010)
 Steven Berkoff (born 1937)
 Brian Blessed (born 1937)
 Orlando Bloom (born 1977)
 Emily Blunt (born 1983)
 Richard Briers (1934–2013) 
 Tony Britton (1924–2019)
 Millie Bobby Brown (born 2004)
 Kelly Brook (born 1979)
 Kathy Burke (born 1964)
 Saffron Burrows (born 1972)
 Sebastian Cabot (1918–1977)
 Sir Michael Caine (born 1933)
 Brian Cant (1933–2017)
 Fanny Carby (1925–2002)
 Helena Bonham Carter (born 1966)
 Kim Cattrall (born 1956)
 Julian Chagrin (born 1940)
 Joan Collins (born 1933)
 Daniel Craig (born 1968)
 Michael Crawford (born 1942)
 Mackenzie Crook (born 1971)
 Benedict Cumberbatch (born 1976)
 Tim Curry (born 1946)

D-F

 Jack Davenport (born 1973)
 Anthony Dawson (1916–1992)
 Daniel Day-Lewis (born 1957)
 Roger Delgado (1918–1973)
 Dame Judi Dench (born 1934)
 Sarah Douglas (actress) (born 1952)
 Minnie Driver (born 1970)
 Christopher Eccleston (born 1964)
 Tamsin Egerton (born 1988)
 Jennifer Ehle (born 1969)
 Idris Elba (born 1972)
 Jennifer Ellison (born 1983)
 Alice Eve (born 1982)
 Rupert Everett (born 1959)
 Craig Fairbrass (born 1964)
 JJ Feild (born 1978)
 Tom Felton (born 1987)
 Emerald Fennell (born 1985) 
 Joseph Fiennes (born 1970)
 Ralph Fiennes (born 1962)
 Colin Firth (born 1960)
 Dexter Fletcher (born 1966)
 Jamie Foreman (born 1958)
 George Formby (1904–1961)
 Claire Forlani (born 1972)
 Emilia Fox (born 1974)
 James Frain (born 1968)
 Martin Freeman (born 1971)
 Anna Friel (born 1976)
 Sadie Frost (born 1965)

G-I

 Sir Michael Gambon (born 1940)
 Romola Garai (born 1982)
 Patricia Garwood (born 1941)
 Sir John Gielgud (1904–2000)
 Stephen Graham (born 1973)
 Holliday Grainger (born 1988)
 Cary Grant (1904–1986)
 Hugh Grant (born 1960)
 Leslie Grantham (born 1947)
 Sydney Greenstreet (1879–1954)
 John Gregson (1919–1975)
 Rupert Grint (born 1988)
 Sienna Guillory (born 1975)
 Sir Alec Guinness (1914–2000)
 Binnie Hale (1899–1984)
 Sonnie Hale (1902–1959)
 Brian Hall (1937–1997)
 Rebecca Hall (born 1982)
 Gordon Harker (1885–1967)
 Dani Harmer (born 1989)
 Ricci Harnett (born 1973)
 Frank Harper (born 1962)
 William Hartnell (1908–1975)
 Jack Hawkins (1910–1973)
 David Hawthorne (1888–1942)
 Will Hay (1888–1949)
 Georgie Henley (born 1995)
 Audrey Hepburn (1929–1993)
 Tom Hiddleston (born 1981)
 Dame Wendy Hiller (1912–2003)
 Tom Holland (born 1996)
 Stanley Holloway (1890–1982)
 Bob Hoskins (1942–2014)
 Nicholas Hoult (born 1989)
 Leslie Howard (1893–1943)
 Annie Hulley (born 1955)
 Rosie Huntington-Whiteley (born 1987)
 Elizabeth Hurley (born 1965)
 John Hurt (1940–2017)
 Jeremy Irons (born 1948)

J-L

 Theo James (born 1984)
 Sir David Jason (born 1940)
 Ernest Jay (1893–1957)
 Aaron Johnson (born 1990)
 Boris Karloff (1887–1969)
 Toby Kebbell (born 1982)
 Malcolm Keen (1887–1970)
 William Kempe (died 1603)
 Skandar Keynes (born 1991)
 Sir Ben Kingsley (born 1943)
 Keira Knightley (born 1985)
 Bobby Knutt (1945–2017)
 Charles Laughton (1899–1962)
 Stan Laurel (1890–1965)
 Hugh Laurie (born 1959)
 Jude Law (born 1972)
 Jane Leeves (born 1961)
 Vivien Leigh (1913–1967)
 Margaret Lockwood (1916–1990)
 Joanna Lumley (born 1946)
 Ricardo P Lloyd (born 1993)

M-O

 Patrick Macnee (1922–2015)
 Miles Mander (1888–1946)
 Roy Marsden (born 1941)
 Anna Massey (1937–2011)
 Martine McCutcheon (born 1976)
 Sir Ian McKellen (born 1939)
 Gus McNaughton (1881–1969)
 Sienna Miller (born 1981)
 Wentworth Miller (born 1972)
 Hayley Mills (born 1946)
 Sir John Mills (1908–2005)
 Dame Helen Mirren (born 1945)
 Georgia Tennant (née Moffett) (born 1984)
 Wingold Lawrence (1874–1938)
 Dominic Monaghan (born 1976)
 Sir Roger Moore (1927–2017)
 Nick Moran (born 1969)
 Kenneth More (1914–1982)
 Joseph Morgan (born 1981)
 Samantha Morton (born 1977)
 William Moseley (born 1987)
 Carey Mulligan (born 1985)
 Billy Murray (born 1941)
 Sophia Myles (born 1980)
 Parminder Nagra (born 1975)
 Cathleen Nesbitt (1888–1982)
 Anthony Newley (1931–1999)
 Bill Nighy (born 1949)
 David Niven (1910–1983)
 Merle Oberon (born 1911–1979)
 Sophie Okonedo (born 1969)
 Gary Oldman (born 1958)
 Sir Laurence Olivier (1907–1989)
 Clive Owen (born 1964)

P-R

 Cecil Parker (1897–1971)
 Dev Patel (born 1990)
 Robert Pattinson (born 1986)
 Simon Pegg (born 1970)
 Alex Pettyfer (born 1990)
 Tim Pigott-Smith (1946–2017)
 Rosamund Pike (born 1979)
 Billie Piper (born 1982)
 Anna Popplewell (born 1988)
 Dominic Purcell (born 1970)
 Daniel Radcliffe (born 1989)
 Adil Ray OBE (born 1974)
 Oliver Reed (1938–1999)
 Joely Richardson (born 1965)
 Miranda Richardson (born 1958)
 Natasha Richardson (1963–2009)
 Sir Ralph Richardson (1902–1983)
 Alan Rickman (1946–2016)
 Michael Ripper (1913–2000)
 William Roache MBE (born 1932)
 John Robinson (1908–1979)
 Stewart Rome (1886–1965)
 Tim Roth (born 1958)
 Sophie Rundle (born 1988)
 Dame Margaret Rutherford (1892–1972)

S-Z

 George Sanders (1906–1972)
 Terry Scully (1932–2001)
 Peter Sellers (1925–1980)
 Jane Seymour (born 1951)
 Robert Shaw (1927–1978)
 Susan Shaw (1929–1978)
 Nicollette Sheridan (born 1963)
 Sir Donald Sinden (1923–2014)
 Dame Maggie Smith (born 1934)
 Matt Smith (born 1982)
 Terence Stamp (born 1938)
 Shirley Stelfox (1941–2015)
 Rachel Stevens (born 1978)
 Ronnie Stevens (1925–2006)
 Patrick Stewart (born 1940)
 Una Stubbs (1937–2021)
 Tilda Swinton (born 1960)
 Alma Taylor (1895–1974)
 Dame Elizabeth Taylor (1932–2011)
 Juno Temple (born 1989)
 Kristin Scott Thomas (born 1960)
 Ralph Truman (1900–1977)
 Chrissie White (1895–1989)
 Michael Wilding (1912–1979)
 Tom Wilkinson (born 1948)
 Kate Winslet (born 1975)
 Ray Winstone (born 1957)
 Sir Donald Wolfit (1902–1968)
 Katherine Woodville (1948–2013)

Actors